Axel Rauschenbach (born 14 July 1967) is a German pair skater who competed for Germany and, before its reunification, East Germany. With Mandy Wötzel, he is the 1989 European silver medalist, the 1989 & 1990 East German national champion, and 1991 German national champion.

Personal life 
Rauschenbach was born 14 July 1967 in Dresden, East Germany. He married Anett Pötzsch and is the stepfather of Claudia Rauschenbach.

Career 

Rauschenbach began competing with Mandy Wötzel by 1987. They trained in Chemnitz and represented East Germany early in their career.

Wötzel/Rauschenbach won the silver medal at the 1989 European Championships but missed the 1989 World Championships. That year, Rauschenbach's skate blade struck Wötzel's head while they were performing side-by-side camel spins. After she recovered, they continued competing. They represented Germany at the 1992 Winter Olympics, where they placed 8th. In 1992, he ended their partnership to work at a bank.

A year later, Rauschenbach teamed up with Anuschka Gläser. They won the 1994 German national title and represented Germany at the 1994 Winter Olympics, where they placed 13th.

Results

With Anuschka Gläser

With Mandy Wötzel

References

External links 

 

German male pair skaters
Figure skaters at the 1992 Winter Olympics
Figure skaters at the 1994 Winter Olympics
Olympic figure skaters of Germany
Sportspeople from Dresden
Living people
1967 births
European Figure Skating Championships medalists